Silvia Prochádzková (born 6 April 1992) is a Slovak model and beauty pageant titleholder who was crowned Miss Slovenskej Republiky 2014 and represented her country at the Miss Universe 2014  Competition.

Early life
Silvia Prochádzková is a student at City University of Seattle in Bratislava.

Pageantry

Miss Universe Slovenskej Republiky 2014
Prochádzková was crowned as Miss Universe Slovenskej Republiky 2014 represented Bratislava.

Miss Universe 2014 

Prochádzková competed at Miss Universe 2014 but Unplaced

References

External links
Official Miss Universe Slovenskej Republiky website

1992 births
Living people
Slovak beauty pageant winners
Miss Universe 2014 contestants
People from Bratislava